Philip Kaye (born December 1931) is a British businessman and restaurateur, and the founder of the Garfunkel's Restaurant casual dining chain.

Early life
Philip Kaye was born in December 1931. The family name was originally Kropifko. In 1953, his brother Reginald Kropifko, a handbag manufacturer, of 21 Bryanston Mansions, York Street, London W1, changed his name by deed poll to Reginald Kaye.

Career
Kaye and his late brother Reginald Kaye started running Wimpy franchises, before establishing the Golden Egg brand, one of the UK's first national restaurant chains.

Kaye by himself then founded the Garfunkel's Restaurant casual dining chain, and later Deep Pan Pizza, Chi Chis and Café Uno.

In 2015, the Kaye family restaurant holdings included the Prezzo, ASK Italian, and Zizzi chains.

Personal life
He is the father of Adam Kaye and Samuel Kaye, co-founders of the ASK Italian casual dining chain.

References

1931 births
Living people
British company founders
British restaurateurs